This is a list of Spanish television related events in 1995.

Events 
 18 March: The wedding ceremony of Elena de Borbón and Jaime de Marichalar is broadcast by La 1, directed by Pilar Miró. It gets the day-time highest audience for a TV channel since 1990: 8.623.000 viewers (71,4% share).
 12 April: For the first time a Private Channel News Program Antena 3 Noticias, hosted by Olga Viza  overtakes in viewers the State owned La 1 News Program Telediario
 13 May: Anabel Conde represents Spain at the Eurovision Song Contest 1995 held in Dublin (Ireland) with the song Vuelve conmigo, ranking 2nd and scoring 119 points.
 19 October: The documentary program Documentos TV broadcasts the investigation story Las habitaciones de la muerte  (Death Rooms), about the terrible condition of thousand of girls in orphanages in China; Spanish society gets shocked and the program unleashes a surge of international adoptions in the country.
 11 November: Marcos Llunas, representing TVE, wins the Festival OTI de la Canción.
 28 December: On air last episode of Antena 3 favorite sitcom Farmacia de Guardia, with 11.527.000 viewers 62.8% share.

Debuts

Television shows

Ending this year

Foreign series debuts in Spain

Births 
 4 January: María Isabel, singer, winner of Junior Eurovision Song Contest 2004 representing TVE.
 23 September - Patrick Criado, actor.
 27 December - Carlos Cuevas, actor

Deaths 
 10 January - Gabriel Aragón, clown, 72
 26 April - Luis Miravitlles, host, 65
 3 May - Joaquín Prat, host, 66
 16 May - Lola Flores, singer, actress y hostess, 72
 4 July - Irene Gutiérrez Caba, actress, 66
 10 October - Juan Manuel Soriano, host, 75
 23 October - Kiko Ledgard, host, 76
 22 November - Esperanza Grases, actress, 75

See also
 1995 in Spain
 List of Spanish films of 1995

References 

1995 in Spanish television